Voice of Canadians was a right-wing political advocacy group that existed in Canada during the 1990s.  Based in Ontario, it opposed official multiculturalism and official bilingualism.  Some of its leading members, including chairman Dick Field, later joined the Freedom Party of Ontario.

Libertarianism in Canada
Political advocacy groups in Canada